Edward Sylvester Ellis (April 11, 1840 – June 20, 1916) was an American author who was born in Ohio and died at Cliff Island, Maine.

Ellis was a teacher, school administrator, journalist, and the author of hundreds of books and magazine articles  that he produced by his name and by a number of pen names. Notable fiction stories by Ellis include The Steam Man of the Prairies and Seth Jones, or the Captives of the Frontier. Internationally, Edward S. Ellis is probably known best for his Deerfoot novels read widely by young boys until the 1950s.

Dime novels
Seth Jones was the most significant of early dime novels of publishers Beadle and Adams. It is said that Seth Jones was one of Abraham Lincoln's favorite stories. During the mid-1880s, after a fiction-writing career of some thirty years, Ellis eventually began composing more serious works of biography, history, and persuasive writing.  Of note was "The Life of Colonel David Crockett", which had the story of Davy Crockett giving a speech usually called "Not Yours To Give".  It was a speech in opposition to awarding money to a Navy widow on the grounds that Congress had no Constitutional mandate to give charity.  It was said to have been inspired by Crockett's meeting with a Horatio Bunce, a much quoted man in Libertarian circles, but one for whom historical evidence is non-existent.

Pseudonyms
Besides the one hundred fifty-nine books published by his own name, Ellis' work was published under various pseudonyms, including:

"James Fenimore Cooper Adams" or "Captain Bruin Adams" (68 titles)
"Boynton M. Belknap" (9 titles)
"J. G. Bethune" (1 title)
"Captain Latham C. Carleton" (2 titles)
"Frank Faulkner" (1 title)
"Capt. R. M. Hawthorne" (4 titles)
"Lieut. Ned Hunter" (5 titles)
"Lieut. R. H. Jayne" (at least 2 titles in the War Whoop series) 
"Charles E. Lasalle" (16 titles)
"H. R. Millbank" (3 titles)
"Billex Muller" (3 titles)
"Lieut. J. H. Randolph" (8 titles)
"Emerson Rodman" (10 titles)
"E. A. St. Mox" (2 titles)
"Seelin Robins" (19 titles)

Partial bibliography
Seth Jones, or the Captives of the Frontier (1860)
The Steam Man of the Prairies (1868)
The Forest Monster (1870)
Life and Times of Daniel Boone...with Sketches of Simon Kenton, Lewis Wetzel, and Other Leaders in the Settlement of the West (1884)
A Young Hero (1888)
The Boy Hunters of Kentucky (1889)
 On The Trail Of The Moose (1894)
Across Texas (1894)
The Young Scout (1895)
Lost in the Rockies (1898)
The Life of Kit Carson; Hunter, Trapper, Guide, Indian Agent, and Colonel U.S.A. (189
A Strange Craft And Its Wonderful Voyage (1900)
Deerfoot on the Prairies (1905)
The Flying Boys in the Sky (1911)
The Boy Patrol on Guard  (1913)
The Dragon of the Skies (1915)
 The Stories of the Greatest Nations (with Charles Francis Horne) 
 Spain: The Story of a Great Nation (with Charles Francis Horne) 
 Russia: The Story of a Great Nation (with Charles Francis Horne)

Deerfoot series
Ellis' best known books follow the adventures of Deerfoot of the Shawnee, a young Native American renowned for his skill with the bow, and his abilities as a runner.
Deerfoot in the Forest
The Hunters of the Ozark
Deerfoot in the Mountains
Deerfoot on the Pairies
The Camp in the Mountains
The Last War Trail

Log Cabin series
This series introduces the characters Oskar Relstaub and Jack Carleton. Deerfoot appears in the second and third books.
The Lost Trail (1884)
Campfire and Wigwam (1885)
Footprints in the Forest (1886)

References

External links

 
Works by Edward S. Ellis at Nickels and Dimes from Northern Illinois University
 
 
 
 
 

1840 births
1916 deaths
American male biographers
19th-century American historians
19th-century American novelists
20th-century American novelists
People from Geneva, Ohio
Western (genre) writers
20th-century American biographers
American male novelists
American male essayists
19th-century essayists
20th-century American essayists
19th-century American male writers
Dime novelists
20th-century American male writers